The Quaker Cemetery is a privately owned cemetery in  Leicester, Massachusetts.  It lies on land donated to the local Quakers that is positioned between the Worcester Regional Airport and Worcester Reservoir. The actual name is the Friends Cemetery but it is more commonly known as the Spider Gates Cemetery.

History
The cemetery was founded in 1740. The first Quakers in Leicester were the Ralph Earle family and the John Potter family. The first burial was in 1740. The first Southwick, Amasa, didn't arrive in Leicester until 1800 and had nothing to do with the founding of the cemetery in 1740. The Southwick family probably joined in 1810 or thereabouts and became one of the largest groups to be buried in the cemetery. The Leicester Quakers closed the meeting around 1850 and transferred it to the Worcester meeting. The granite posts and iron gates were installed in 1895 under the terms of a bequest made by Dr. Pliny Earle. Their design was originally meant to represent the rays of the sun but have since taken on their more popular name of Spider Gates.  The Southwick family has since had to replace one of the gates as it was stolen but an exact replica of the remaining gate was made so it is nearly impossible to tell the difference.  The cemetery is currently maintained and in use by the Worcester Friends Meeting with the most recent burial being near 2013.

Policy
The Worcester Friends Meeting tries diligently to keep the cemetery a peaceful and restful place as cemeteries should be.  The cemetery is open to visitors during the hours of daylight but is closed once darkness falls.

Because of the frequent visits made to the cemetery and its proximity to both the Worcester Regional Airport and Worcester Reservoir, the area is well patrolled by the Leicester police.

References

External links
 Spider Gates

Leicester, Massachusetts
Cemeteries in Worcester County, Massachusetts
Quaker cemeteries